Chemsex is a 2015 British documentary film about gay men engaging in chemsex in London, England. The film was directed and produced by William Fairman and Max Gogarty for Vice Media.

Chemsex had a theatrical release on 4 December 2015 and was released on DVD on 11 January 2016.

References

External links
 
 
 Chemsex trailer at Vice
 Chemsex page at Peccadillo Pictures

2015 films
British LGBT-related films
2015 documentary films
British documentary films
Documentary films about London
Documentary films about gay men
2015 LGBT-related films
Vice Films films
2010s English-language films
2010s British films